Danail Milušev (born ) is a Bulgarian male volleyball player. He was part of the Bulgaria men's national volleyball team at the 2014 FIVB Volleyball Men's World Championship in Poland. He played for Power Volley Milano.

Clubs
2002-2005	Neftohimik Burgas
 2005-2006	Pallavolo Mantova
 2006-2007	AS Cannes
 2007-2008	Tours Volley-Ball
 2008-2009	Halkbank Ankara
 2009-2010	Korean Air Jumbos
 2010-2012	NMV Castellana
 2012-2013	Argos Sora
 2013-2014	Spacer's Tolosa
 2014-2015	FC Tokyo
 2015-	Power Volley Milano

References

1984 births
Living people
Bulgarian men's volleyball players
Place of birth missing (living people)
Sportspeople from Varna, Bulgaria